The South Highlands Fire Station, at 763 Oneonta in Shreveport, Louisiana, was built in 1929. It was listed on the National Register of Historic Places in 1991.  It has also been known as Fire Station No. 10.

It was designed by architect Henry Schwartz. According to its NRHP nomination, "The South Highlands Fire Station is conspicuous among Shreveport's vast collection of early twentieth century eclectic buildings because of its very unusual choice of inspiration. Although it is an evocative interpretation rather than an exact copy, it strongly reflects the influence of the German vernacular architecture of the Middle Ages."

It is also a contributing property in the South Highlands Historic District.

See also  
 Central Fire Station (Shreveport, Louisiana)
 Shreveport Fire Station No. 8
 National Register of Historic Places listings in Caddo Parish, Louisiana

References

Fire stations on the National Register of Historic Places in Louisiana
National Register of Historic Places in Caddo Parish, Louisiana

Fire stations completed in 1929
1929 establishments in Louisiana
Buildings and structures in Shreveport, Louisiana